The Bena–Mboi (Ɓəna–Mboi)  Yungur languages form a branch of the Adamawa family. They are spoken in central Adamawa State, eastern Nigeria, just to the east of Lafia LGA.

Idiatov & van de Velde (2019) classify the Bena–Mboi languages as Benue-Congo.

Classification
In the Adamawa Languages Project website, Kleinewillinghöfer (2011) classifies the Ɓəna-Mboi or Yungur group as follows.
Ɓəna-Mboi (Yungur)
ɓəna
ɓəna Yungur
ɓəna Yungur
Voro
ɓəna Lala
ɓəna Lala of Yang
ɓəna Lala of Bodwai (Bodɛ)
Robma
(Robma of) Dingai
Mboi (Gəna)
Mboi of Livo; Mboi of Gulungo
Mboi of Haanda; Mboi of Banga
Kaan (Libo)

Names and locations
Below is a list of language names, populations, and locations from Blench (2019).

References

External links
Ɓəna-Mboi (Yungur) group (Adamawa Languages Project)

 
Languages of Nigeria